Haylett is a surname.

List of people with the surname 

 A. Eugene Haylett (1903–1965), American football and basketball coach
 Alice Haylett (1923–2004), American baseball player
 Dane Haylett-Petty (born 1989), retired Australian rugby union footballer
 James Haylett (1825–1907), British lifeboatman
 John Haylett (1945–2019), British journalist
 Jon Haylett, British novelist
 Martha Haylett, Australian politician
 Ross Haylett-Petty (born 1994), South African-born, Australian rugby union player
 Ward Haylett (1895–1990), American football player and coach

See also 

 Hallett

Surnames
Surnames of British Isles origin